The Former Citizens Bank and Trust Company Building is a historic bank building located at Waynesville, Haywood County, North Carolina. It was built in 1921, and is a two-story, brick and marble front rectangular building in the Classical Revival style. It measures 76 feet by 31 feet and features a tall parapet faced with marble block that rises above the cornice.  The bank ceased operation in 1932, and the building has since housed retail businesses.

It was listed on the National Register of Historic Places in 1991.  It is located in the Waynesville Main Street Historic District.

References

Bank buildings on the National Register of Historic Places in North Carolina
Neoclassical architecture in North Carolina
Commercial buildings completed in 1921
Buildings and structures in Haywood County, North Carolina
National Register of Historic Places in Haywood County, North Carolina
Historic district contributing properties in North Carolina
Waynesville, North Carolina